Borysyuk is a Ukrainian-language surname derived from the first name Boris. It may be Russified as Borisyuk. It may refer to:

Ariel Borysiuk, Polish footballer
Mykhaylo Borysyuk, a Hero of Ukraine
Oleksandr Borysyuk, Ukrainian athlete
Sergey Borisyuk, a Hero of the Russian Federation

Ukrainian-language surnames